James McPherson Russell (November 10, 1786 – November 14, 1870) was a Whig member of the U.S. House of Representatives from Pennsylvania.

Biography
James M. Russell (father of Samuel Lyon Russell) was born in York, Pennsylvania.  He moved with his parents to a farm near Gettysburg, Pennsylvania.  He attended the classical academy of James Ross in Chambersburg, Pennsylvania.  He studied law, was admitted to the bar of Franklin County, Pennsylvania, in 1807 and to the Bedford County, Pennsylvania, bar in 1808 and commenced practice in Bedford.

He was the first burgess of Bedford Borough in the years 1818 and 1819 and a member of the State constitutional convention in 1837.

Russell was elected as a Whig to the Twenty-seventh Congress to fill the vacancy caused by the death of Henry Black.  His opponent, according to the Daily Atlas, was "Mr. Philson of Somerset". He was not a candidate for renomination in 1842.

He resumed the practice of law, and served as trustee of the Bedford Academy and secretary of the Chambersburg & Bedford Turnpike Company.  He died in Bedford in 1870.  Interment in Bedford Cemetery.

References

The Political Graveyard

Sources

External links 
 

1786 births
1870 deaths
Pennsylvania lawyers
Politicians from York, Pennsylvania
Whig Party members of the United States House of Representatives from Pennsylvania
19th-century American politicians
19th-century American lawyers